Ottavio Cogliati  (4 June 1939 – 20 April 2008) was an Italian cyclist who won a gold medal in the team time trial at the 1960 Summer Olympics. After that he turned professional and rode the 1962 and 1963 Tour de France. He retired in 1964, and later worked as a salesman of alcoholic beverages.

References

1939 births
2008 deaths
Italian male cyclists
Olympic gold medalists for Italy
Cyclists at the 1960 Summer Olympics
Olympic cyclists of Italy
Olympic medalists in cycling
Cyclists from the Metropolitan City of Milan
Medalists at the 1960 Summer Olympics